1623 Vivian, provisional designation , is a carbonaceous Themis asteroid from the outer region of the asteroid belt, approximately 25 kilometers in diameter. It was discovered on 9 August 1948, by South African astronomer Ernest Johnson at Johannesburg Observatory in South Africa. It was named after Vivian Hirst, daughter of British astronomer William P. Hirst.

Orbit and classification 

Vivian is a C-type asteroid and member of the Themis family, a large family of asteroids with nearly coplanar ecliptical orbits. It orbits the Sun in the outer main-belt at a distance of 2.7–3.6 AU once every 5 years and 7 months (2,035 days). Its orbit has an eccentricity of 0.16 and an inclination of 2° with respect to the ecliptic. Vivians observation arc begins with its official discovery observation, as no precoveries were taken, and no prior identifications were made.

Rotation period and pole 

In March 2006, a rotational lightcurve of Vivian was obtained by American astronomer Lawrence Molnar at the Calvin–Rehoboth Observatory in New Mexico. It gave it a rotation period of 20.5209 hours with a brightness variation of 0.85 magnitude. Modeled lightcurve data gave a concurring period of 20.5235 hours.

Diameter and albedo 

According to the surveys carried out by the Japanese Akari satellite and NASA's Wide-field Infrared Survey Explorer with its subsequent NEOWISE mission, Vivian measures between 24.77 and 29.98 kilometers in diameter, and its surface has an albedo between 0.075 and 0.08. The Collaborative Asteroid Lightcurve Link assumes an albedo of 0.08 and calculates a diameter of 25.82 kilometers with an absolute magnitude of 11.3.

Naming 

This minor planet was named in honor of Vivian Hirst, daughter of British astronomer William P. Hirst, receiver of the Astronomical Society of Southern Africa's Gill Medal and after whom the minor planet 3172 Hirst is named. Hirst calculated the preliminary orbit for this and several other minor planets discovered by Ernest Johnson. The official  was published by the Minor Planet Center on 1 January 1974.

References

External links 
 Asteroid Lightcurve Database (LCDB), query form (info )
 Dictionary of Minor Planet Names, Google books
 Asteroids and comets rotation curves, CdR – Observatoire de Genève, Raoul Behrend
 Discovery Circumstances: Numbered Minor Planets (1)-(5000) – Minor Planet Center
 
 

001623
Discoveries by Ernest Leonard Johnson
Named minor planets
19480809